The Boucles de Spa is a Belgian motor rally.

Winners
 1953 Richard - - Volkswagen
 1954 Gendebien - Wascher - Aston Martin
 1955 No finishers - all out of time
 1956 Evrard - Collignon - Ford Anglia
 1962 Sander - Sander - DAF 33
 1963 Event cancelled
 1964 Staepaelere - Meeuwissen - Lotus Cortina
 1965 Mombaerts - Mosbeaux - Lotus Elan
 1967 Staepaelere - Christiaens - Ford Cortina GT
 1968 Jacquemin - Chavan - Renault 8 Gordini
 1969 Jacquemin - Demey - Alpine 110
 1970 Chavan - Van Gutshoven - Alfa Romeo Duetto
 1971 Pedro - 'Jimmy' - BMW 2002 Tii
 1972 Adriensens - Daemers - BMW 2002 Tii
 1973 Haxe - Delferrier - DAF 66
 1974 Brink - 'Idel' - Porsche Carrera
 1975 Staepaelere - Vaillant - Ford Escort RS1800
 1976 Blomqvist - Sylvan - Saab 99 EMS
 1977 Pond - Fred Gallagher - Triumph TR7
 1978 Dumont - Materne - Opel Kadett GTE
 1979 Kleint - Wanger - Opel Ascona 1.9
 1980 Blomqvist - Cederberg - Saab 99 Turbo
 1981 Snijers - Symens - Ford Escort RS1800
 1982 Colsoul - Lopes - Opel Ascona 400
 1983 Duez - Lux - Audi Quattro
 1984 Capone - Cresto - Lancia 037 Rally
 1985 Waldegård - Thorszelius - Audi Quattro
 1986 Probst - De Canck - Ford Sierra 4x4
 1987 Snijers - Colebunders - Lancia Delta HF 4WD
 1988 Snijers - Colebunders - BMW M3
 1989 Snijers - Colebunders - Toyota Celica GT-Four ST165
 1990 Saby - Grateloup - Lancia Delta Integrale

Rally competitions in Belgium